QSI International School of Astana is a branch of Quality Schools International located in Astana, Kazakhstan. QSI Astana was founded in 2005 as a non-profit, private institution. QSI International School of Astana has an English language of instruction; it offers a curriculum taught entirely in English from elementary school to secondary school. In 2013 a new facility completed construction. The facility contains 32 classrooms, 3 computer labs, an auditorium, gymnasium, cafeteria, library, outdoor soccer field ( with an Olympic running track) and basketball court, and several playgrounds. Approximately 250 students with over 25 different nationalities are enrolled for the 2015-2016 school year. Classes range from Preschool to High School level.

Accreditation 
QSI Astana is based on the American Education system. All subjects (excluding second-language classes) are taught in English. Standardized MAP (Measurement of Academic Progress) tests have been adopted to provide an initial academic benchmark and intellectual progress of the school's students. The school has been accredited by MSA/CESS (Middle States Commissions on Elementary and Secondary Schools) since 2011. QSI International School of Astana has also been certified as a legitimate testing center for the SAT Reasoning Test and all AP (Advanced Placement) tests. PSAT (Preliminary SAT) exams are offered to all secondary students. The school is licensed by Kazakh Ministry of Education.

Curriculum
The QSI education system differs from the traditional American system in several aspects. The naming of the key stages in the QSI curricular system diverges from typical naming. Additionally, the different stages cover different age groups. The table below represents all the changes:

A variety of AP Courses is offered, ranging from AP World History to AP Chemistry. Apart from Spanish, Russian and Kazakh languages are also offered in QSI Astana. The school, being located in Kazakhstan, is obligated to abide by Kazakhstan's Ministry of Education's regulations. To meet the regulations, QSI Astana, QSI Aktau, QSI Atyrau, and Almaty International School (QSI Almaty) made Kazakh History, Kazakh Language, and Military Preparation classes mandatory for all Kazakh nationals. Intensive English class is compulsory for ESL (English as a Second Language) students who have struggles effectively communicating in English. A university counselor is also offered to the senior class. Study Hall is offered to high school students with tight schedules and/or numerous AP subjects.

The QSI grading system also differs from that of traditional American schools:

TSW ("The Student Will") are a set of guiding points that illustrate what the student should learn in the unit/subject. A TSW sheet is created by a group of teachers with expertise in that particular subject. Every unit in every subject has a TSW sheet.

All QSI schools are based on the course credit system. Each whole-year subject contains 10 units. Each semester-long subject contains 5 units. A single completed unit with a grade of B or above will earn a student 1 credit. A pupil must earn 220 credits throughout his secondary (high school) years and complete all mandatory subjects such as Algebra I and Biology to earn a Standard Diploma. If a student wishes to receive an Academic Diploma, they must earn 240 credits and embark on additional English and Social Science classes. With a student wishes to receive an Academic Diploma with Honors, he/she must complete 2 AP subjects between Secondary 1 and Secondary 4 as well as meeting the requirements of both the Standard and Academic Diploma. The student must complete the subject's AP exam with a score of 3 or above. The mandatory courses for the 3 diplomas are as listed:

Facility
The newly built school offers students a much broader spectrum of extra-curricular activities. The facility contains a fully functional 400m track with proper markings. Inside the track is an official size soccer field, made from synthetic grass and rubber bits. Adjacent to the track is a Long Jump Pit and an outdoor tennis/basketball court.

References

Astana
Education in Kazakhstan
Schools in Astana
2005 establishments in Kazakhstan
Educational institutions established in 2005